Saik-i Şadi was one of four wooden-hulled  paddle frigates built for the Ottoman Navy in the 1840s; they were the first Ottoman-built warships powered by steam. The ship had a relatively uneventful career; she saw limited action during the Crimean War in 1853, when she fought a small action against a Russian frigate in the Black Sea. The future Sultan, Abdülaziz, frequently used the ship as his yacht in the 1850s, but she otherwise saw little active use before being decommissioned in 1867 and broken up in 1869.

Design
Saik-i Şadi was a  paddle frigate. Her tonnage was 1,443 tons burthen. She was propelled by a pair of paddlewheels that were driven by a direct-acting steam engine, with steam provided by two coal-fired boilers. She had a crew of 320.

The ship was armed with a battery of two  shell-firing Paixhans guns on the upper deck, four 32-pdr guns also on the upper deck, and twenty-four 32-pdr guns on the main deck. The guns were all of British manufacture, as Ottoman cannon foundries lacked the expertise necessary to manufacture modern shell-firing guns.

Service history
Saik-i Şadi was ordered in 1845 as part of a modest naval expansion program aimed at building the first steam-powered ships of the Ottoman Navy. Several steam yachts had been built in the 1830s, but these were primarily used by government officials and were not proper warships. She was laid down the following year at the Imperial Arsenal in Constantinople, and was launched in 1847. During construction, she was allocated for use as another yacht for Sultan Abdulmejid I. She was completed that year and following sea trials, was commissioned into the fleet that year. Since steam engines were still a novelty in the Ottoman fleet, the crew had no experience operating the machinery and so four skilled engineers were contracted to train the crew.

Saik-i Şadi saw action during the Crimean War. In September 1853, the Ottoman fleet organized three squadrons in the Black Sea as tensions with Russia rose. Saik-i Şadi was assigned to a squadron consisting of her three sister ships, under the command of Mustafa Pasha. The squadron was tasked with patrolling the eastern Black Sea coast of the Ottoman Empire, including Circassia and Georgia. They scored only two hits on the Russian vessel, inflicting no damage, while the Ottoman frigates were hit several times.

After arriving in Sinop, Mustafa attempted to convince Osman to withdraw from the exposed position, but the latter refused and his squadron was subsequently annihilated at the Battle of Sinop on 30 November. Mustafa Pasha had already sent three of his ships, including Feyzâ-i Bahrî, back to Constantinople on 22 November. The destruction of the fleet at Sinop drastically reduced the ability of the Ottoman Navy to take an active role in the war, and thereafter the Anglo-French fleets led the effort against the Russian Black Sea Fleet.

During the 1850s, Abdülaziz, who became sultan in 1861, frequently cruised aboard Saik-i Şadi, which was by then being used as a yacht. In 1857, the ship's armament was reduced to a battery of twelve 32-pdr guns on the main deck. She remained in service for another decade, being decommissioned in 1867 and sold for scrap two years later. She was then broken up at the Imperial Arsenal.

Notes

References
 
 
 

Crimean War naval ships of the Ottoman Empire
1847 ships
Mecidiye-class frigate
Ships built in Istanbul